Vallicula is a genus of ctenophora in the family Coeloplanidae, containing a single species, Vallicula multiformis.

References

Monotypic ctenophore genera